Megatrends in Brutality is the debut album of the Swedish death metal band Comecon. It was released in 1992 on Century Media Records. Contrary to the album credits, the drums were recorded using a drum computer; Anders Green who is listed as a drummer does not exist. The photograph shows an unrecognizable friend of the band. The order of the tracks on the album sleeve is wrong; the correct order is shown below.

Track listing
  "The Dogdays"   – 3:01  
  "Wash away the Filth"  – 3:31  
  "Slope"  – 3:12  
  "Teuton Tantrums"  – 3:13  
  "The Mule"  – 2:17  
  "Armed Solution"  – 4:36  
  "The Future Belongs to Us"  – 3:45  
  "Conductor of Ashes"  – 3:51  
  "Good Boy Benito"  – 3:57  
  "Omnivorous Excess"  – 4:10  
  "Ulcer"  – 4:16

Credits 
 Rasmus Ekman – guitar, bass
 Pelle Ström – guitar, bass
 Lars-Göran Petrov – vocals

Comecon (band) albums
1992 debut albums